Antonio Ciciliano (3 November 1932 – 4 September 2015) was an Italian competitive sailor and Olympic medalist. He won a bronze medal in the Dragon class at the 1960 Summer Olympics in Rome.

References

External links
 
 
 
 

1932 births
2015 deaths
Italian male sailors (sport)
Sailors at the 1960 Summer Olympics – Dragon
Olympic sailors of Italy
Olympic bronze medalists for Italy
Olympic medalists in sailing
Medalists at the 1960 Summer Olympics